Sean Cooney (born 31 October 1983) is an Irish soccer player.

A central defender, Cooney started his career at Coventry City and has also played for Woking, Bohemians and Finn Harps. He has represented the Republic of Ireland at Under-21 level, making his debut against Italy in February 2004. Sean is now a youth soccer coach in Texas.

References 

1983 births
Living people
Soccer players from Perth, Western Australia
Association football defenders
Republic of Ireland association footballers
Coventry City F.C. players
Woking F.C. players
Bohemian F.C. players
English Football League players
League of Ireland players
Finn Harps F.C. players
Republic of Ireland under-21 international footballers